Hebeloma laterinum is a species of mushroom in the family Hymenogastraceae.

laterinum
Fungi of Europe